Veronika Ihász (born 20 September 1985) is a Hungarian female professional darts player who currently plays in the World Darts Federation (WDF) events. She is a seven-time Apatin Open Champion and first Hungarian player who qualified for the WDF World Darts Championship.

Career
Ihász started playing darts before 2009. In 2009, she took her first triumph at the Hungarian Open where she beat Viktória Kiss. In the following years, she maintained a high position in the national ranking of women. In 2011, she won another international tournament Carinthian Open. She also advanced to the quarter-finals in Belgium Open and Czech Open.

In 2021, she won Budapest Classic and Budapest Masters. With these good results, Ihász qualified for the 2022 WDF World Darts Championship for the first time in her career. There she won first match against Paula Murphy with a whitewash. Then in the second round match, she hit the biggest outshot for a female competitor in World Professional Darts Championship history with a 164, but lost 1–2 in sets to Beau Greaves.

World Championship results

WDF
 2022: Second round (lost to Beau Greaves 1–2) (sets)
 2023:

Performance timeline

References

Living people
1985 births
British Darts Organisation players
Female darts players
Hungarian darts players